Winners is a half-hour motorsports television show hosted by NASCAR driver Neil Bonnett that aired for four seasons from April 7, 1991 to July 17, 1994. The show aired on TNN and each episode profiled a different championship racer. Following Bonnett's death on February 11, 1994, the show was renamed Neil Bonnett's Winners and continued for one additional season with guest hosts.

Episodes

Season 1 (1991)

Season 2 (1992)

Season 3 (1993)

Season 4 (1994)

For the fourth season, the show was named Neil Bonnett's Winners. A variety of guest hosts were used including Darrell Waltrip, Rusty Wallace, John Force, Kenny Bernstein, and Lyn St. James. Bonnett was still featured in the show conducting interviews with drivers filmed before his death. The Steve Grissom episode is noteworthy as it was filmed at the Indigo Lake Golf and Tennis Club in Daytona Beach, Florida the day before Bonnett died.

References

http://www.decadesofracing.net/NeilBonnett.htm

NASCAR on television
1991 American television series debuts
1994 American television series endings
Spike (TV network) original programming